Dmitry Vasilyevich Buryak (born June 5, 1987) is a Russian sprint athlete.

Achievements

References
 

1987 births
Living people
Russian male sprinters
Universiade medalists in athletics (track and field)
Universiade gold medalists for Russia
Universiade bronze medalists for Russia
Medalists at the 2007 Summer Universiade
Medalists at the 2011 Summer Universiade
21st-century Russian people